Christine Roche (born 1939) is French-Canadian illustrator, cartoonist, teacher and film-maker who lives and works in London. Her work has appeared in several books, magazines, and national newspapers. She now paints.

Biography
Christine Roche has illustrated many books, both for children and adults, and worked for a number of leading publishers. She has produced animated films for Channel 4 and UNICEF, and lectured in various colleges including the London College of Communication, the Royal College of Art and the National Institute of Design (NID) in India.

Roche cartooned for the publication Spare Rib before co-founding and self-publishing Sourcream in 1979 with Jo Nesbitt, Liz Mackie and Lesley Ruda. More underground British women cartoonists became involved in Sourcream No. 2, which was published in 1981 by the Sheba Feminist Press in paperback.

Roche joined a number of collectives, including the Kids Book Group, and the Hackney Flashers collective of feminist photographers that started in the 1970s and produced exhibitions on "Women at Work" and "Who's Holding the Baby?".

She is author of I'm Not a Feminist But... (1985) which she made into an animated film with Marjut Rimminen.

She also co-directed the short animated films The Stain (1991) viewable at the Internet Archive and Someone Must Be Trusted (1987).

In addition, she designed the characters in the children's television cartoon series Treasure

Her work appears in the anthology Funny Girls – Cartooning for Equality edited by Diane Atkinson (Penguin Books, 1997), and The Inking Woman: 250 Years of Women Cartoon and Comic Artists in Britain, edited by Nicola Streeten and Cath Tate (Myriad Editions, 2018).

Bibliography

As author
 I'm Not a Feminist But... – Virago Press Ltd (1985):

As illustrator
 How We Play (Anita Harper) – Viking Children's Books (1979):  (also: How We Work, How We Live and How We Feel)
 Sourcream (Jo Nesbitt, Lesley Ruda, Liz Mackie, Christine Roche) – Sheba Feminist Publishers (1980): ASIN B000U0OH90
 Sweet Freedom: Struggle for Women's Liberation (Anna Coote, Beatrix Campbell) – Picador (1982): 
 A Women's History of Sex (Harriett Gilbert) – Pandora Press (1987): 
 Abigail at the Beach (Felix Pirani) – Collins (1988): 
 Abigail Goes Visiting (Felix Pirani) – Collins (1990): 
 Triplets (Felix Pirani) – Viking Press (1991): 
 Pregnancy Book (Nancy Kohner, Angela Phillips) – Health Education Authority (1993): 
 The Universe for Beginners (Felix Pirani) – Icon Books Ltd (1994): 
 Give Your Baby a Head Start: How to Kick the Smoking Habit – Health Education Authority (1994): 
 Women's Health Guide (Ann Furedi, Mary Tidyman) – Health Education Authority (1994) :
 The Young Person's Guide to Saving the Planet (Bernadette Vallely, Debbie Silver) – Chivers Press (new edition 1990): 
 So Young, So Sad, So Listen (Philip Graham, Carol Hughes) – Gaskell (1995): 
 Pregnancy, Birth and the First Five Years (Nancy Kohner, Angela Phillips) – Health Education Authority (new edition 1995): 
 Pregnancy Book: A Complete Guide to Pregnancy, Childbirth and the First Few Weeks with a New Baby (Nancy Kohner, Angela Phillips) – Health Education Authority (3rd revised edition 1996): 
 What Treasure Did Next (Gina Davidson) – Virago Press Ltd (1996): 
 Living with a Stranger (Valerie Stillwell) – Gaskell (1997): 
 Religion (What's the Big Idea?) (Anita Ganeri) – Hodder Children's Books (1998): ISBN 978-0-340-66719-4
 Nuclear Power (What's the Big Idea?) (Felix Pirani) – Hodder Children's Books (1998): 
 Drugs Centre Stage – volume one (Chris Scanlan) – LittleOctopus Publishing (2006): 
 Drugs Centre Stage – volume two (Chris Scanlan) – LittleOctopus Publishing (2006): 
 Introducing the Universe (Felix Pirani) – Icon Books Ltd (new edition 2006):

As painter 
 2009: Morley Gallery
 2009: Cafe Gallery
 2010: Burgh House
 2011: West Eleven Gallery
 2011: Colour Gallery
 2012: St. Martins in the Field
 2012: Core Arts
 2012: LCP (London Centre of Psychotherapy)
 2014: St. Martins in the Field
 2015: Islington Arts Society
 2016: Islington Arts Society
 2016: National Open Art (NOA)
 2017: Royal Academy Summer Exhibition
 2017: National Open Art (NOA)
 2017: Ply Gallery

Filmography 
The Stain (1991)
Someone Must Be Trusted (1987) – one of a series of four short animated documentaries about Women and the Law
I'm Not a Feminist But... (1985)

References

External links
 

Living people
1939 births
20th-century British women artists
21st-century British women artists
British cartoonists
British women cartoonists
British women illustrators
British children's book illustrators
Canadian women cartoonists
Canadian women illustrators
Canadian children's book illustrators